Joshua Majid Hmami (born 22 March 2000) is an English professional footballer who plays as an attacking midfielder for Southport.

Club career

Accrington Stanley 

On 30 December 2017, Hmami made his professional debut for Accrington Stanley in their EFL League Two match against Grimsby Town, replacing Billy Kee in the 3–0 victory.

The New Saints 

In May 2018 he joined The New Saints in the Welsh Premier League.

FC United of Manchester (loan) 

In December 2018 he joined FC United of Manchester on loan.

Ramsbottom United (loan) 

in August 2019 he joined Ramsbottom United on loan until January 2020.

Marine

in June 2020 he joined Marine.

Southport

On 10 July 2021, Hmami joined Southport in the National League North on a two year contract.

Career statistics

References

External links
 

1999 births
Living people
English footballers
Association football midfielders
Accrington Stanley F.C. players
English Football League players
The New Saints F.C. players
Footballers from Oldham
F.C. United of Manchester players
Ramsbottom United F.C. players
Marine F.C. players